Heinrich Brandt (8 November 1886, in Feudingen – 9 October 1954, in Halle, Saxony-Anhalt) was a German mathematician who was the first to develop the concept of a groupoid.

Brandt studied at the University of Göttingen and, from 1910 to 1913, at the University of Strasbourg. In 1912 he attained his doctorate; he was a student of Heinrich Martin Weber. From 1913 he was assistant at the University of Karlsruhe (TH). He taught geometry and applied mathematics from 1921 at RWTH Aachen. From 1930 he was the chair for mathematics at the University of Halle.

A Brandt matrix is a computational way of describing the Hecke operator action on theta series as modular forms. The theory was developed in part by Brandt's student Martin Eichler. It offers an algorithmic approach for machine computation (in that theta series span spaces of modular forms); the theory is now considered by means of Brandt modules.

See also
 Brandt semigroup

External links 
 H.-J. Hoehnke and M.-A. Knus (2004) A Tribute to (the work of) Heinrich Brandt on the 50 anniversary of his death, link from ETH Zurich
 Heinrich Brandt from Martin Luther University of Halle-Wittenberg
 

1886 births
1954 deaths
20th-century German mathematicians
University of Göttingen alumni
University of Strasbourg alumni
Academic staff of the Karlsruhe Institute of Technology
Academic staff of the Martin Luther University of Halle-Wittenberg